Saint Lullus (Lull or Lul) (born about 710 AD in Wessex, died 16 October 786 in Hersfeld) was the first permanent archbishop of Mainz, succeeding Saint Boniface, and first abbot of the Benedictine Hersfeld Abbey. He is historiographically considered the first official sovereign of the Electorate of Mainz.

Monk to archbishop
Lullus was born in Wessex around 710 AD. He was a monk in the Benedictine monastery of Malmesbury Abbey in Wiltshire. It is possible that his earlier name was "Rehdgerus" (possible in a multitude of spellings including Ratkar, Hredgar, Raedgar, etc.). During a pilgrimage to Rome in 737 he met Saint Boniface and decided to join him in his missionary work in northern Germany. In 738, Lullus joined the Benedictine monastery of Fritzlar, founded by Boniface in 732, where his teacher was abbot Saint Wigbert who had also come from England.

In 741, Charles Martel died, and in this year the most important phase of Boniface's career started, with Lullus as his closest assistant. Many of the biographical facts about Lullus derive from the Boniface Correspondence: he is attested as a deacon in 745-46, as Boniface's archdeacon in 746-47, and as priest in 751 though he was probably ordained before that. The correspondence evidences that Lullus was trusted enough to be Boniface's messenger (he went to Rome twice on his behalf) and this includes the secret negotiations over Boniface's successor at Mainz. Lullus exchanges letters (and gifts) with Edburga of Minster-in-Thanet and Leoba, among others; as the youngest of  Boniface's associates and not yet tied to a specific place, he grew to be his closest associate. Moreover, a study by Michael Tangl, cited by Theodor Schieffer, suggests that Boniface, whose eyesight had begun to fail him early in the 740s, may have used Lullus's services in reading and writing the letters that were such an important part of his work, and Tangl suspected that Lullus likely cooperated with Boniface on some of the most important letters.

King Pippin confirmed him in 753 as bishop of Mainz and in 754 he became archbishop, as Saint Boniface resigned and appointed Lullus his successor. Lullus became the first regular archbishop of Mainz when Pope Hadrian I granted him the pallium in about 781. He then greatly expanded his bishopric by absorbing those of Büraburg (near Fritzlar) and Erfurt.

Carolingian era
From 769 onward, Lullus promoted the establishment of the Carolingian style monastery of Hersfeld Abbey, which he succeeded in having placed under Charlemagne's Carolingian dynasty protection in 775.

Lullus's chief accomplishment was the completion of Saint Boniface's reform of the church in the Frankish Carolingian Empire and the successful conclusion of the Christianization of the Germans in Hesse-Thuringia. But while Boniface had looked for a close link to Rome, Lullus sought a better understanding with the Frankish kings.

Lullus died on 16 October 786 in Hersfeld Abbey at Bad Hersfeld, and is buried in the church.

Veneration

Lullus was canonized on 7 April 852.

The Vita Lulli, written by Lampert of Hersfeld (probably between 1063 and 1073) led to Lullus being venerated as a saint and becoming the main patron of the abbey along with Wigbert.

Lullusfest, the oldest folk festival in Germany, marked its 1,160th birthday in 2012. The festival celebrates the founding of the city of Bad Hersfeld. Founded more than 1,275 years ago, the city still reveres St Lullus, who left Malmesbury in the 730s on a mission to convert the German tribes to Christianity.

See also
List of Carolingian monasteries
Carolingian Renaissance

References

Further reading
 Anton Philipp Brück: "Der Mainzer „Lullismus“ im 18. Jahrhundert", in: JbBistumMainz; 4, 1949, pp. 314–338.
 Michael Fleck (ed.): Lampert von Hersfeld. Das Leben des heiligen Lullus. N. G. Elwert, Marburg, 2007. 
 Jakob Schmidt: "Zwei angelsächsische Heilige, St. Bonifatius und St. Lullus, als Oberhirten von Mainz", in: JbBistumMainz; 2, 1947, pp. 274–291.
 Franz Staab: "Lul und die Entwicklung vom Bistum zum Erzbistum". In: Handbuch der Mainzer Kirchengeschichte, Bd. 1 Christliche Antike und Mittelalter. Echter, Würzburg 2000, pp. 136–145

External links 
School of York
 

Year of birth uncertain
710 births
786 deaths

8th-century archbishops
8th-century Frankish saints
8th-century Frankish bishops
8th-century Frankish writers

8th-century Latin writers

8th-century Christian theologians

Archbishops of Mainz

Medieval German saints
West Saxon saints